Virginia Inn is a bar and restaurant in Seattle, Washington's Pike Place Market. Located in the Hotel Livingston, the Inn opened in 1903, four years before the Market. The establishment was a filming location for Sleepless in Seattle and Singles.

References

External links

 

1903 establishments in Washington (state)
Drinking establishments in Washington (state)
Restaurants established in 1903
Restaurants in Seattle
Central Waterfront, Seattle